Susan Ness (born August 11, 1948) is an American attorney who served as a Commissioner of the Federal Communications Commission from 1994 to 2001.

References

External links

1948 births
Living people
Members of the Federal Communications Commission
New Jersey Democrats
People from Elizabeth, New Jersey
George H. W. Bush administration personnel
Clinton administration personnel